Marie Curie High School (French: Lycée Marie Curie, Vietnamese: Trường Trung học Phổ thông Marie Curie) is a public high school in District 3, Ho Chi Minh City, Vietnam.  Established in 1918 and named after the Nobel prize-winning scientist Marie Curie by the French colonial government, it remains the sole high school in Saigon that still bears its original name. 

Founded in 1918 as an all-girls school, it began accepting boys in 1970.  In 1997, it was turned into a semi-public high school.  In the recent past, it was one of the largest high schools in Vietnam, with around 5000 students in regular attendance.  In 2007, it became a public high school.

History
 

As soon as the French occupied Cochinchina (Cochinchine), they started constructing schools to teach French and Annamese. Lycée Marie Curie School was established between 1858 and 1862 (the year France gained protection of Cochinchina under the Treaty of Nham Tuat).

The school, named after scientist Marie Curie since 1918, is an all-girls school. After the Japanese entered Indochina in 1941, the school was requisitioned as a hospital, so all activities were moved to a kindergarten on Pham Ngoc Thach Street. A year later, the school was returned to its original location under the new name of Calmette Middle School. After the French returned to occupy Saigon on September 23, 1945, the school was renamed Lucien Mossard High School. In early 1948, it was renamed as Marie Curie High School (or Lycée Marie Curie). During the Republic of Vietnam era, the school was a private high school for girls. In 1970, the school started accepting male students.

List of Principals
Lycée Marie Curie
1948 – 1950: Madame Marie
1950 – 1954: Mrs. Fortunel
1954 – 1965: Mr. Castagnon
1965 – 1974: Mr. Gages
1974 – 1975: Mr. Thevenin

Marie Curie High School
1975 – 1977: Tôn Tuyết Dung
1977 – 1978: Lê Thị Loan
1978 – 1987: Trần Tố Nga
1987 – 1992: Hoàng Bảo Quân
1992 – 1999: Dương Thu Hằng
1999 – 2000: Nguyễn Bác Dụng
2000 – 2006: Nguyễn Đình Hân
2006 – 2008: Nguyễn Ngọc Lang
2008 – 2016: Nguyễn Văn Vân
2016 – 2023: Nguyễn Đăng Khoa
2023 - now: Nguyễn Vân Yên

Notable alumni

 Akira Phan, singer
 Bảo Thy, singer
 Cao Bá Hưng, singer
 Đông Nhi, singer
 Gin Tuấn Kiệt, singer, actor
 Huỳnh Đông, actor
 Loan Chau, singer
 Nhật Tinh Anh, singer
 Nguyễn Thiên Nga, Miss Vietnam in 1996
 Phuong Dung, singer
 Quang Vinh, singer
 Suboi, rapper, singer, actress
 Sy Hoang, Ao Dai designer
 Thanh Lan, singer
 Thuỳ Lâm, model, actress
 Tôn Nữ Thị Ninh, former Vice Chairman of the Foreign Affairs Committee of the National Assembly of Vietnam
 Trương Hòa Bình, Deputy Prime Minister of Vietnam
 Tuyet Nguyet, Asian art expert
 Võ Hoàng Yến, model

References

External links

Official website
 Lycée Marie Curie de Saïgon
 Marie Curie high school - Saigon - Vietnam - Student forum

Educational institutions established in 1918
High schools in Vietnam
High schools in Ho Chi Minh City
1918 establishments in French Indochina